Gordon R. Hahn (April 15, 1919 – March 29, 2001) was a member of the Los Angeles City Council and California State Assembly in the mid-20th Century.

While on the council, he cast the decisive vote that brought the Brooklyn Dodgers to Los Angeles and was instrumental in the appointment of Gilbert Lindsay, who became the first African American on the city council.

His brother, Kenneth Hahn, was Los Angeles County supervisor for 40 years. After Kenneth suffered a stroke in 1987, Gordon was his field deputy until Kenneth retired in 1992.

Biography
Hahn was born in Kindersley, Saskatchewan, the sixth of the seven children of John and Hattie (Wiggins) Hahn. His father died when he was an infant, leaving his mother to raise the large family on a $60-per-month pension. She moved the family to a small house on Flower Street in Los Angeles, where his younger brother, Kenneth, was born.

Hahn worked his way through Pepperdine University, graduated from the United States Merchant Marine Academy and was a Naval Reserve officer during World War II.

After leaving office, he worked in the real estate business. He died of pneumonia caused by respiratory failure on March 29, 2001. Hahn was buried in Riverside National Cemetery in Riverside, California.

Political career

Assembly
In 1946, at the age of 27, he was elected as a Republican in the 66th District of the California State Assembly, becoming the youngest legislator in a decade. He served three and a half terms in the Assembly, from 1947 until his resignation in 1953.

City Council
See also List of Los Angeles municipal election returns, 1953 and after.

Hahn was appointed  to fill the  Los Angeles City Council District 8  seat vacated by his brother, Kenneth, who had been elected to the Los Angeles County Board of Supervisors. Gordon was elected to the council in his own right after  the expiration of his brother's term and served on the council until 1963.

In 1955 District 8 included  an area ". . . bordering on Huntington Park and Vernon, from Vernon Avenue to 94th Street. . . . A considerable percentage of the population is Negro; they hold that their race should have some representation in the City Council. On the other hand, left-wing Democrats, following the banner of Rep. Jimmy Roosevelt, also have a candidate in the race, which may split the Negro vote."

While he was on the council he chaired the Revenue and Taxation Committee. During an eight-day smog blanket over Los Angeles in 1954, Hahn told the Associated Press, "this thing has gone far enough, health should come before industry."

Other contests
He ran to represent California's 31st District in the U.S. House of Representatives in 1962, losing to Democrat Charles H. Wilson, 48 percent to 52 percent. In 1986, he made an unsuccessful bid for Los Angeles County Assessor.

See also
 Hahn family of California
 History of the Brooklyn Dodgers

References

External links

Join California Gordon Hahn

1919 births
2001 deaths
American members of the Churches of Christ
Burials at Riverside National Cemetery
Canadian emigrants to the United States
Los Angeles City Council members
Republican Party members of the California State Assembly
People from Kindersley
Pepperdine University alumni
20th-century American politicians
Hahn family
United States Navy personnel of World War II